The Dublin Writers Museum was opened in November 1991 at No 18, Parnell Square, Dublin, Ireland. The museum occupies an original 18th-century house, which accommodates the museum rooms, library, gallery, and administration area. The annexe behind it has a coffee shop and bookshop on the ground floor and exhibition and lecture rooms on the floors above. Dublin stuccatore Michael Stapleton decorated the upstairs gallery. The Irish Writers' Centre, next door in No 19, contains the meeting rooms and offices of the Irish Writers' Union, the Society of Irish Playwrights, the Irish Children's Book Trust and the Irish Translators' & Interpreters' Association. The basement beneath both houses is occupied by the Chapter One restaurant.

The Museum was established to promote interest, through its collection, displays and activities, in Irish literature as a whole and in the lives and works of individual Irish writers. Through its association with the Irish Writers' Centre it provides a link with living writers and the international literary scene. On a national level it acts as a centre, simultaneously pulling together the strands of Irish literature and complementing the smaller, more detailed museums devoted to individuals like James Joyce, George Bernard Shaw, William Butler Yeats and Patrick Pearse. It functions as a place where people can come from Dublin, Ireland and abroad to experience the phenomenon of Irish writing both as history and as actuality.

The writers featured in the Museum are those who have made an important contribution to Irish or international literature or, on a local level, to the literature of Dublin. It is a view of Irish literature from a Dublin perspective.

On display in the museum are literary ephemera and memorabilia, including a detailed replica of The Book of Kells, Samuel Beckett's phone, a letter from 'tenement aristocrat' Brendan Behan to his brother, the Abbey Theatre ephemera of Lady Gregory, a 1910 letter from W.B. Yeats, opening night programmes for Oscar Wilde plays An Ideal Husband and Lady Windermere's Fan, an 1804 edition of Gulliver's Travels by Jonathan Swift, a third edition of The Crock of Gold by James Stephens, a first edition of James Joyce's Pomes Penyeach, and a first edition of Bram Stoker's Dracula along with an autograph letter from Stoker.

The museum also includes portraits of Irish writers, including fine originals by artists such as Patrick Swift, Reginald Gray, Edward McGuire and Harry Kernoff.

David Norris launched his presidential campaign ahead of the Irish presidential election at Dublin Writers Museum on 5 October 2011.

The Dublin Writers Museum has been closed since March 2020 due to the Covid-19 lockdown.

Gallery

References

External links
Dublin Writers Museum official website

Museums established in 1991
Art museums and galleries in the Republic of Ireland
History museums in the Republic of Ireland
Irish literature
Literary museums in Ireland
Museums in Dublin (city)
1991 establishments in Ireland
Parnell Square